Legio XVI  Gallica ("Gallic Sixteenth Legion") was a legion of the Imperial Roman army. The legion was recruited by Julius Caesar's adopted son, Octavian in 41/40 BC. It was disbanded after surrendering during the Batavian rebellion (AD 70); Emperor Vespasian created a new legion, the XVI Flavia Firma.


Attested members

See also 
 List of Roman legions

External links 

 "Legio XVI Gallica" on livius.org (Last accessed 2 January 2020)

References

16 Gallica
40s BC establishments
1st-century BC establishments in the Roman Republic
Military units and formations established in the 1st century BC
70s disestablishments in the Roman Empire